The Czech Athletics Championships is an annual outdoor track and field competition organised by the Czech Athletics Federation, which serves at the national championship for the sport in the Czech Republic. It superseded the Czechoslovak Athletics Championships as the national championship in 1993, though the competition was hosted as a sub-national event prior to then. A Czech Championships was held in 1970, separate from the Czechoslovak event that year.

Editions

Championship records

Men

Women

See also 
 List of Czech records in athletics

References

External links 
 ČAS – Czech Athletic Federation

 
National athletics competitions
Recurring sporting events established in 1970
Athletics competitions in the Czech Republic
Athletics